Valerie Pearson is a Canadian actress from Calgary, Alberta. She is most noted for her performance in the 1991 film Solitaire, for which she received a Genie Award nomination for Best Actress at the 13th Genie Awards in 1992.

Career 
Pearson has been most prominently associated with stage roles in Calgary and Edmonton, including productions of Edward Connell's Welcome to Theatre Fabulous!, Giselle Lemire and Robert Astle's Mama Never Told Me That, Patricia Benedict's Good Government, Thornton Wilder's Our Town, Judith Thompson's Lion in the Streets, and Ron Chambers's Marg Szkaluba (Pissy's Wife). She won an Elizabeth Sterling Haynes Award for Outstanding Actress in a Supporting Role in 1992, for Lion in the Streets.

Her other film credits have included Cowboys Don't Cry, Dead Bang, The Right Kind of Wrong, and Chicks with Sticks.

Filmography

Film

Television

References

External links

20th-century Canadian actresses
21st-century Canadian actresses
Canadian film actresses
Canadian stage actresses
Actresses from Calgary
Living people
Year of birth missing (living people)